Euphyllia baliensis, commonly known as bubble coral, is a species of large-polyped stony coral belonging to the family Euphylliidae.

Description
It is best distinguished from other members of the genus Euphyllia by its "comparatively very small corallites (averaging 3 mm diameter) and much shorter, thinner, lightly calcified branches."

Distribution & habitat
It can be found at depths of 27 to 37 meters off the central eastern coast of Bali, Indonesia. The species has not been reported from any other locality.

References 

Animals described in 2012
Euphylliidae